Splendrillia houbricki is a species of sea snail, a marine gastropod mollusk in the family Drilliidae.

Description
The length of the shell attains 5.4 mm.

Distribution
This marine species occurs in the Mozambique Channel.

References

 Wells, Fred E. "A revision of the drilliid genera Splendrillia and Plagiostropha (Gastropoda: Conoidea) from New Caledonia, with additional records from other areas." Mémoires du Muséum national d'histoire naturelle 167 (1995): 527–556.

External links
  Tucker, J.K. 2004 Catalog of recent and fossil turrids (Mollusca: Gastropoda). Zootaxa 682:1-1295.
 Holotype at MNHN, Paris

houbricki
Gastropods described in 1995